Wallace Collins (born April 11, 1941) is an American politician.

Prior to his political career, Collins worked as a machinist. He faced Republican Steve Byas in 1996 election, and succeeded Ed Crocker as member of the Oklahoma House of Representatives from the 45th district. Collins won reelection in 1998, then lost to Thad Balkman twice, in 2000 and 2002. From 2001 to 2005, he led the Cleveland County Democratic Party. He returned to the state house in 2007, by defeating Balkman. Collins faced Aaron Stiles in 2008. He was unseated by Stiles' second campaign in 2010. The next year, Collins was elected chairman of the Oklahoma Democratic Party. Collins won reelection as state party leader in 2013, and retired at the end of his second term.

References

1941 births
Living people
Democratic Party members of the Oklahoma House of Representatives
20th-century American politicians
21st-century American politicians